The 60th Infantry Division was a French Army formation during World War I and World War II.

World War 1
During World War I, the division comprised:
202nd Infantry Regiment
225th Infantry Regiment
247th Infantry Regiment (to March 1917)
248th Infantry Regiment
271st Infantry Regiment (to June 1916)
336th Infantry Regiment (to June 1916)
28th Territorial Infantry Regiment (from August 1918)

It was part of the French 1st, 4th, 6th, 8th, 10th, 11th, 12th, 13th, 15th, 21st, 30th, 31st, 35th, 2nd Colonial, 2nd Cavalry Corps, during which it participated in the Battle of the Ardennes, the First Battle of the Marne, the First Battle of the Aisne, the First Battle of Champagne, the Battle of the Lys, and the Meuse-Argonne Offensive.

At various times, it was part of the French First Army, French Second Army, French Third Army, French Fourth Army, French Fifth Army, French Sixth Army, French Seventh Army and French Ninth Army

World War 2
During the Battle of France in May 1940 the division was made up of the following units:
241st Infantry Regiment
270th Infantry Regiment
271st Infantry Regiment
68th Reconnaissance Battalion
50th Artillery Regiment

It was a Series B Reserve division containing older reservists.

References

Infantry Division, 60th
Infantry Division, 60
Infantry divisions of France